Vino may refer to:

Computing 
 Vino (operating system), an open-source operating system
 Vino (VNC server), a Remote Desktop sharing library for GNOME

Locations 
 Vino, California, a former settlement in Fresno County
 Vino, Grosuplje, a village in the Municipality of Grosuplje, central Slovenia
 Cascada del Vino, a Venezuelan waterfall
 El Vino, a London wine bar and off licence

People 
 Vino Noharathalingam (born 1963), Sri Lankan politician
 Dr. Vino, pen name for American author and wine educator Tyler Colman
 Vino, nickname of Russian cyclist Alexander Vinokourov
 Vino, a character in the anime and manga series Zatch Bell!

Other 
 ViNO or Federation of Green Youth and Students, a Finnish organization
 Vino (album), a 2008 album by Dräco Rosa
 Vino 100, a North American franchise
 Yamaha Vino 125, a 2004 scooter
 VINO (Virgin Islands News Online), a news website in the British Virgin Islands
Vino, a word for wine in some languages

See also 
 Mondovino, a 2004 American documentary film
 Vinoš Sofka (1929–2016), Czech museologist
 In vino veritas (disambiguation)